San Elijo College is a private, four year Great Books college in San Marcos, California. It admitted its first class in 2010.

History

Campus

Organization

Academic profile
One of several Great Books colleges which follow the general educational style of St. John's College, San Elijo College is "merely Christian" and committed to the Nicene Creed as its foundational theological documents. As a classical college, the college is also committed to the seven liberal arts, which compose a large component of the curriculum.

Each San Elijo student takes courses in the grammar, logic, rhetoric, mathematics, geometry, music, and astronomy. They will also read and study the traditional works of western culture. The objective of San Elijo College is to bring in students and faculty with an open mind, diverse background, and a strong commitment to classical education.

Student life

Noted people

References

External links

Liberal arts colleges in California
Universities and colleges in San Diego County, California
Education in San Marcos, California
Private universities and colleges in California
Educational institutions established in 2009
2009 establishments in California